Glycerol-3-phosphate dehydrogenase 1 is a protein that in humans is encoded by the GPD1 gene.

Function
This gene encodes a member of the NAD-dependent glycerol-3-phosphate dehydrogenase family. The encoded protein plays a critical role in carbohydrate and lipid metabolism by catalyzing the reversible conversion of dihydroxyacetone phosphate (DHAP) and reduced nicotine adenine dinucleotide (NADH) to glycerol 3-phosphate (G3P) and NAD+.

The encoded cytosolic protein and mitochondrial glycerol-3-phosphate dehydrogenase also form a glycerol phosphate shuttle that facilitates the transfer of reducing equivalents from the cytosol to mitochondria.

Mutations in this gene are a cause of transient infantile hypertriglyceridemia. Alternatively spliced transcript variants encoding multiple isoforms have been observed for this gene.

References

Further reading